Clynotoides is a monotypic genus of Argentinian jumping spiders containing the single species, Clynotoides dorae. It was first described by Cândido Firmino de Mello-Leitão in 1944, and is only found in Argentina. The name is a reference to Clynotis, meaning "having the likeness of Clynotis".

Its taxonomic relationships within the family Salticidae are uncertain.

References

Salticidae
Monotypic Salticidae genera
Spiders of Argentina
Taxa named by Cândido Firmino de Mello-Leitão